Yarisleidy Mena Noro (born 17 February 1994) is a Cuban footballer who plays as a midfielder for the Cuba women's national team.

International career
Mena capped for Cuba at senior level during the 2010 CONCACAF Women's World Cup Qualifying qualification, the 2012 CONCACAF Women's Olympic Qualifying Tournament (and its qualification) and the 2018 CONCACAF Women's Championship (and its qualification).

References

1994 births
Living people
Cuban women's footballers
Women's association football midfielders
FC Villa Clara players
Cuba women's international footballers
21st-century Cuban women